This is a list of home video releases of the series The Fairly OddParents.

Region 1 [United States & Canada]
 An episode of the sixth season, "Wishology" is not listed in season sets. Nickelodeon and Amazon.com teamed up to release The Fairly OddParents and other Nick shows on manufacture-on-demand DVD-R discs available exclusively through Amazon.com's CreateSpace arm.

NOTE: The episode "Christmas Everyday!" along with Christmas episodes of Fanboy & Chum Chum and T.U.F.F. Puppy  were supposed to be on the It's a SpongeBob Christmas! DVD, but they were dropped from the actual release. However, the Target exclusive of It's A SpongeBob Christmas! included the Christmas episodes of those shows on a bonus disc.

Region 2 [Europe, Egypt, Saudi Arabia, Japan & South Africa]

Region 4 [Australia, New Zealand, Latin America & Caribbean]

References 

Home video releases
Fairly OddParents, The